Graball is an unincorporated community in Marshall County, Tennessee, United States.

References

Unincorporated communities in Marshall County, Tennessee
Unincorporated communities in Tennessee